Liberty Township is one of twenty-two townships in Adams County, Illinois, United States. As of the 2010 census, its population was 1,379 and it contained 557 housing units.

Geography

Cities
 Liberty

Cemeteries
The township contains sixteen cemeteries: Broady Family, Clark Family, Coats, Drescher Family, Elmwood Family, Grubb Family, Hughes Family, Liberty Old, Lierly, Nation, Pearce, Pleasant View, Saint Brigids, Walker, Williams Family and Xander.

Major highways
  Illinois State Route 104

Demographics
As of the 2020 census there were 1,379 people, 447 households, and 366 families residing in the township. The racial makeup of the township was 95.65% White, 0.44% African American, 0.07% Native American, 0.07% Asian, 0.00% Pacific Islander, 0.44% from other races, and 3.34% from two or more races. Hispanic or Latino of any race were 1.09% of the population.

There were 447 households, out of which 41.60% had children under the age of 18 living with them, 67.79% were married couples living together, 14.09% had a female householder with no spouse present, and 18.12% were non-families. 18.10% of all households were made up of individuals, and 10.30% had someone living alone who was 65 years of age or older. The average household size was 2.56 and the average family size was 2.87.

The township's age distribution consisted of 29.6% under the age of 18, 1.9% from 18 to 24, 16.4% from 25 to 44, 40.3% from 45 to 64, and 11.7% who were 65 years of age or older. The median age was 45.5 years. For every 100 females, there were 97.8 males. For every 100 females age 18 and over, there were 85.5 males.

The median income for a household in the township was $76,042, and the median income for a family was $78,468. Males had a median income of $53,417 versus $39,258 for females. The per capita income for the township was $33,369. About 3.6% of families and 8.0% of the population were below the poverty line, including 16.9% of those under age 18 and 5.2% of those age 65 or over.

School districts
 Liberty Community Unit School District 2

Political districts
 Illinois' 18th congressional district
 State House District 93
 State Senate District 47

References
 
 United States Census Bureau 2007 TIGER/Line Shapefiles
 United States National Atlas

External links
 List of Adams County township trustees
 City-Data.com
 Illinois State Archives

Townships in Adams County, Illinois
1849 establishments in Illinois
Populated places established in 1849
Townships in Illinois